Nordiska Berlin was a German association football club from the city of Berlin.

History
Established sometime in 1913, the team was part of the ATSB (Arbeiter-Turn- und Sportbund, en:Workers Gymnastics and Sports Federation), a leftist national sports organization which organized a football competition and championship separate from that of the DFB (Deutscher Fußball Bund, en:German Football Association).

Nordiska took part in the ATSB championship in 1921, beating FT Breslau-Süd 2:1 in a quarterfinal match, before getting through the semifinal past FT Unterweser 3:2 in overtime. They lost the title match 0:3 VfL Leipzig-Südost. Under the Nazis, worker's clubs such as Nordiska were banned in 1933, alongside other clubs with political or religious affiliations.

Following World War II, occupying Allied authorities banned organizations throughout the country, including sports and football clubs, as part of the process of de-Nazification. New clubs began to emerge shortly after the war and the former memberships of Nordiska and Berliner SC Normannia became part of Sportgruppe Nordost which, after the re-establishment of Normannia in 1950, gave rise to present-day club MSV Normannia 08.

References

External links
Das deutsche Fußball-Archiv historical German domestic league tables 

Football clubs in Germany
German workers' football clubs
Defunct football clubs in Berlin
Association football clubs established in 1913
1913 establishments in Germany
1933 disestablishments in Germany
Association football clubs disestablished in 1933